Jeffrey or Jeff Sanchez may refer to:

 Jeffrey Sanchez (politician) (born 1969), American politician
 Jeffrey Sanchez (jockey) (born 1985), Puerto Rican jockey
 Jeff Sanchez (defensive back, born 1962), American football player
 Jeff Sanchez (defensive back, born 1981), American football player